Country-wide local elections for seats in municipality and county councils were held throughout Norway on 13 and 14 September 1987. For most places this meant that two elections, the municipal elections and the county elections ran concurrently.

Results

Municipal elections
Results of the 1987 municipal elections.

County elections
Results of the 1987 county elections.

References

1987
1987
1987 elections in Europe
1987 in Norway